Victor de Bonald (1780–1871), son of Louis Gabriel Ambroise de Bonald, followed his father in his exile. He was rector of the Academy of Montpellier after the Bourbon Restoration, but lost his post during the Hundred Days. Regaining it at the Second Restoration, he resigned finally in 1830. He wrote  (1833),  (1835), and a life of his father.

References

1780 births
1871 deaths
French essayists
French biographers
French male essayists
Male biographers